The following outline is provided as an overview of and topical guide to the Solar System:

Solar System – gravitationally bound system comprising the Sun and the objects that orbit it, either directly or indirectly. Of those objects that orbit the Sun directly, the largest eight are the planets (including Earth), with the remainder being significantly smaller objects, such as dwarf planets and small Solar System bodies. Of the objects that orbit the Sun indirectly, the moons, two are larger than the smallest planet, Mercury.

Regions and celestial objects of the Solar System 

 Sun ☉
 Solar wind
 Interplanetary medium
 Inner Solar System
 Inner planets
 Mercury ☿
 Venus ♀
 Earth 🜨
 The Moon ☾
 Near-Earth objects
 Van Allen radiation belt
 Mars ♂
 Moons of Mars
 Asteroid belt
 Asteroid groups
 Asteroids
 Ceres ⚳
 Pallas ⚴
 Juno ⚵
 Vesta ⚶
 Hygiea
 Active asteroids
 Kirkwood gaps
 Outer Solar System
Outer planets
Jupiter ♃
 Moons of Jupiter
 Io
 Europa
 Ganymede
 Callisto
 Rings of Jupiter
 Magnetosphere of Jupiter
 Jupiter trojans
 Saturn ♄
 Moons of Saturn
 Titan
 Rhea
 Iapetus
 Dione
 Tethys
 Enceladus
 Mimas
 Rings of Saturn
 Shepherd moons
 Magnetosphere of Saturn
 Uranus ⛢
 Moons of Uranus
 Titania
 Oberon
 Umbriel
 Ariel
 Miranda
 Rings of Uranus
 Neptune ♆
 Moons of Neptune
 Triton
 Rings of Neptune
 Trojans
 Centaurs
 Ubiquitous
 Comets ☄
 Meteoroids
 Micrometeoroids
 Cosmic dust
 Interplanetary dust cloud
 Trans-Neptunian region
 Trans-Neptunian objects
 Kuiper belt
 Pluto ♇
 Moons of Pluto
 Charon
 Haumea
 Makemake
 Quaoar
 Orcus
 Scattered disc
 Eris
 Gonggong
 Farthest regions
 Extreme trans-Neptunian objects
 Detached objects
 Sedna
 Leleākūhonua
 Oort cloud
 Heliosphere
 Heliopause
 Boundaries

Location of the Solar System  
 Universe 
Observable universe
Pisces–Cetus Supercluster Complex
Laniakea Supercluster
Virgo Supercluster
Local Sheet
Local Group
Milky Way subgroup
Milky Way
Orion–Cygnus Arm
Gould Belt
Local Bubble
Local Interstellar Cloud – immediate galactic neighborhood of the Solar System.
Alpha Centauri – star system nearest to the Solar System, at about 4.4 light years away
Solar System – star and planetary system where the Earth is located.
Earth – the only planet known to have life, including intelligent life, including humans.

Structure and composition of the Solar System 
 Interplanetary space
 Physical characteristics of the Sun
 Structure of the Sun
 Solar core
 Radiative zone
 Convection zone
 Photosphere
 Chromosphere
 Corona
 Solar granulation
 Sunspots
 Solar prominences
 Solar flares
 Physical characteristics of Mercury
 Structure of Mercury
 Atmosphere of Mercury
 Geology of Mercury
 Physical characteristics of Venus
 Structure of Venus
 Atmosphere of Venus
 Geology of Venus
 Volcanism on Venus 
 Physical characteristics of the Earth
 Figure of the Earth 
 Structure of the Earth
 Earth's crust
 Earth's mantle
 Earth's outer core
 Earth's inner core
 Earth's magnetic field
 Atmosphere of Earth
 Geology of Earth
 Lithosphere of Earth
 Plate tectonics
 Hydrosphere of Earth
 Water distribution on Earth
 Tides
 Physical characteristics of Mars
 Structure of Mars
 Atmosphere of Mars
 Geology of Mars
 Volcanism on Mars
 Geography of Mars
 Water on Mars
 Physical characteristics of Jupiter
 Structure of Jupiter
 Atmosphere of Jupiter
 Great Red Spot
 Physical characteristics of Saturn
 Structure of Saturn
 Atmosphere of Saturn
 Saturn's hexagon
 Physical characteristics of Uranus
 Structure of Uranus
 Atmosphere of Uranus
 Physical characteristics of Neptune
 Structure of Neptune
 Atmosphere of Neptune
 Great Dark Spot

History of the Solar System 

History of the Solar System

Discovery and exploration of the Solar System  
Discovery and exploration of the Solar System – 
 Timeline of Solar System astronomy
 Timeline of discovery of Solar System planets and their moons
 Timeline of Solar System exploration
 Timeline of first images of Earth from space
 Development of hypotheses
 Geocentric model – 
 Heliocentrism –
 Historical models of the Solar System
 Planets beyond Neptune
 List of former planets
 List of hypothetical Solar System objects in astronomy
 Space exploration – Exploration by celestial body
 Exploration of Mercury
 Observations and explorations of Venus
 Exploration of the Moon
 Exploration of Mars
 Exploration of Ceres
 Exploration of Jupiter
 Exploration of Saturn
 Exploration of Uranus
 Exploration of Neptune
 Exploration of Pluto
 Solar System models

Formation and evolution of the Solar System 
Formation and evolution of the Solar System – 
 Nebular hypothesis
 Terrestrial planets
 Iron planets
 Mercury
 Silicate planets
 Geodynamics of Venus
 History of Earth
 Formation of Earth
 Geological history of Mars
 Giant planets
 Gas giants
 Jupiter
 Saturn
 Ice giants 
 Uranus
 Neptune

Lists of Solar System objects and features 
The number of currently known, or observed, objects of the Solar System are in the hundreds of thousands. Many of them are listed in the following articles:

By type 

 List of Solar System objects
 List of gravitationally rounded objects of the Solar System
 Planetary-mass object
 List of natural satellites
 Planetary-mass moon
 List of possible dwarf planets
 List of minor planets (numbered) and List of unnumbered minor planets
 List of trans-Neptunian objects (numbered) and List of unnumbered trans-Neptunian objects
 Lists of comets

By physical parameters and features 
 List of exceptional asteroids
 Lists of geological features of the Solar System
List of craters in the Solar System
 List of Solar System extremes
By size
List of Solar System objects by size
By distance
List of Solar System objects most distant from the Sun
List of Solar System objects by greatest aphelion
Features
List of tallest mountains in the Solar System
List of largest craters in the Solar System
List of largest rifts, canyons and valleys in the Solar System

Lists of Solar System exploring missions and spacecraft

Missions 
 List of missions to the Moon
 List of missions to Venus
 List of missions to Mars
 List of missions to the outer planets
 List of minor planets and comets visited by spacecraft
 List of missions to minor planets
 List of missions to comets

Spacecraft 
 List of Solar System probes
 List of artificial objects in heliocentric orbit
 List of objects at Lagrange points
 List of artificial objects leaving the Solar System
 List of lunar probes
 Lunar Roving Vehicles
 List of extraterrestrial orbiters
 List of Mars orbiters
 List of landings on extraterrestrial bodies
 List of Mars landers
 List of artificial objects on extraterrestrial surfaces
 Deliberate crash landings on extraterrestrial bodies
 List of rovers on extraterrestrial bodies

See also 
 Outline of astronomy
 Outline of space exploration
 Astronomical symbols
 Planetary mnemonic
 HIP 11915 (a solar analog whose planetary system contains a Jupiter analog)

External links 

 dmoz page for Solar System
 Origin of the Solar System (outline)
 A Cosmic History of the Solar System
A Tediously Accurate Map of the Solar System (web based scroll map scaled to the Moon being 1 pixel) 
 NASA/JPL Solar System main page
 NASA's Solar System Simulator
 Solar System Profile by NASA's Solar System Exploration

Wikipedia outlines